This is a list of electoral results for the electoral district of Cockburn in Western Australian state elections.

Members for Cockburn

Election results

Elections in the 2020s

Elections in the 2010s

Elections in the 2000s

Elections in the 1990s

Elections in the 1980s

 Preferences were not distributed.

 Preferences were not distributed.

Elections in the 1970s

Elections in the 1960s 

 Two party preferred vote was estimated.

References

Western Australian state electoral results by district